Succinonitrile, also butanedinitrile, is a nitrile, with the formula of C2H4(CN)2. It is a colorless waxy solid which melts at 58 °C.

Succinonitrile is produced by the addition of hydrogen cyanide to acrylonitrile (hydrocyanation):
CH2=CHCN  +  HCN  →  NCCH2CH2CN

Hydrogenation of succinonitrile yields putrescine (1,4-diaminobutane).

See also
 Malononitrile - A di-nitrile with 3 carbon atoms
 Glutaronitrile - A di-nitrile with 5 carbon atoms
 Adiponitrile - A di-nitrile with 6 carbon atoms

References

External links
 WebBook page for C4H4N2
 CDC - NIOSH Pocket Guide to Chemical Hazards

Alkanedinitriles